The Bad One is a 1930 American Pre-Code black-and-white musical film directed by George Fitzmaurice, starring Dolores del Río and Edmund Lowe, and featuring Boris Karloff. It is a romantic prison drama film.

Cast
 Dolores del Río as Lita
 Edmund Lowe as Jerry Flanagan
 Don Alvarado as The Spaniard
 Blanche Friderici as Madame Durand (as Blanche Frederici)
 Adrienne D'Ambricourt as Madame Pompier
 Ullrich Haupt as Pierre Ferrande
 Mitchell Lewis as Borloff
 Ralph Lewis as Blochet
 Yola d'Avril as Gida
 John St. Polis as Judge
 Henry Kolker as Prosecutor
 George Fawcett as Warden
 Victor Potel as Sailor
 Harry Stubbs as Sailor
 Tom Dugan as Sailor
 Boris Karloff as Monsieur Gaston

See also
 Boris Karloff filmography

External links

The Bad One at OVG.Guide
The Bad One review by The New York Times
The Bad One at TCM Database

1930 films
1930s musical drama films
American musical drama films
American black-and-white films
Films directed by George Fitzmaurice
Films produced by Joseph M. Schenck
United Artists films
1930 drama films
1930s English-language films
1930s American films